Huddleston is an unincorporated community in Oregon County, in the U.S. state of Missouri.

History
A post office called Huddleston was established in 1855, and remained in operation until 1860. The community has the name of Benjamin Huddleston, an early citizen.

References

Unincorporated communities in Oregon County, Missouri
Unincorporated communities in Missouri